Attitude is Japanese Pop singer and actress Meisa Kuroki's first EP. It was released on January 1, 2010, by her record label Studioseven Recordings.

Track listing

Charts

Oricon Sales Charts

Physical Sales Charts

References

External links
Meisa Kuroki Official Site

2010 EPs
Meisa Kuroki albums
Japanese-language EPs

ja:ATTITUDE